Neratziotissa or Nerantziotissa ( or  respectively), is a complex of two train stations located in the median strip of the Attiki Odos motorway in Marousi, a northern suburb of Athens, Greece. The first is a station of Line 1 of the Athens Metro, and the second is a Athens Suburban Railway (suburban rail) station. It takes its name from the nearby Byzantine church of Παναγία Νεραντζιώτισσα (Panagía Nerantziótissa), which was itself named for the abundance of bitter orange trees in the area. The station is near The Mall Athens, a large American-style shopping mall. It is also close to the Athens Olympic Sports Complex.

Nerantziotissa station was built for the 2004 Olympic Games, opening on 6 August 2004. It is served by lines 1, 4 and 5 of the Athens Suburban Railway, all of which terminate at Athens Airport.

Services

Since 15 May 2022, the following weekday services call at this station:

The Metro and Suburban Railway platforms are separated by ticket barriers.

See also
 Athens Metro
 Athens Suburban Railway

References

External links

2004 establishments in Greece
Buildings and structures in North Athens
Marousi
Railway stations in Attica
Railway stations in highway medians
Railway stations opened in 2004
Transport in North Athens
Athens Metro stations